Persatuan Sepakbola Boyolali Indonesia or Persebi (en: Football Association of Indonesia Boyolali) is an  Indonesian football club based in Boyolali, Central Java. Club played in Liga 3. 
Persebi Boyolali has several nicknames, namely Pandan Arang Warriors and The Java Cattles (Sapi Jawa). 
Persebi stadium named Pandan Arang Stadium. Its location was in downtown Boyolali, Central Java.

History 
In 2007 Persebi successfully climbed to the Liga Indonesia First Division. This Boyolali community pride teams, carrying the target of qualifying for the premier division, although only bermaterikan Indonesian players.

Supporter
Persebi supported Pasboy (Pasukan Suppoter Boyolali) supporters group which was declared on March 10, 2007

Players

Current squad

Coaching Staff

Honours
 Liga 3 Central Java
 Runner-up: 2021

References

External links
Persebi Boyolali at Liga-Indonesia.co.id
Persebi Boyolali at Persebi.com
 

Boyolali Regency
Football clubs in Indonesia
Football clubs in Central Java
Association football clubs established in 1975
1975 establishments in Indonesia